Solomakhin is a rural locality (a khutor) in Alexeyevsky District, Belgorod Oblast, Russia. The population was 9 as of 2010. There is 1 street.

Geography 
Solomakhin is located 24 km southwest of Alexeyevka (the district's administrative centre) by road. Yendovitsky is the nearest rural locality.

References 

Rural localities in Alexeyevsky District, Belgorod Oblast